The Tom Lantos Human Rights Commission (formerly known as the Congressional Human Rights Caucus) is a bipartisan caucus of the United States House of Representatives. Its stated mission is "to promote, defend and advocate internationally recognized human rights norms in a nonpartisan manner, both within and outside of Congress, as enshrined in the Universal Declaration of Human Rights and other relevant human rights instruments."

The commission was founded as the Human Rights Caucus in 1983 by Tom Lantos, a California Democrat, and John Porter, an Illinois Republican. Lantos was Hungarian by birth and had the distinction of being the only Holocaust survivor ever to serve in the Congress.

Cases

In 1987, the caucus invited the 14th Dalai Lama to speak about the situation of Tibet. It was the first formal invitation to the Dalai Lama from a U.S. government organization. Lantos later alleged that two Tibetan nationalists were executed by China in retaliation for this visit.

On 31 October 2005, Lantos and the caucus helped arrange for Shan Burmese activist Charm Tong to visit the White House to discuss the Burmese political situation with President George W. Bush, National Security Advisor Stephen J. Hadley, and other senior officials. Charm Tong spoke with Bush about war rape and other women's rights issues in her home of Shan State. Following the meeting, Lantos predicted that Charm Tong's 50 minutes with Bush "would reverberate around the world". The Irrawaddy wrote in December of that year that lobbyists were attributing Bush's subsequent "outspokenness on Burma" to "the Charm Tong Effect".

In 2006, the caucus held hearings on the alleged collaboration of Google, Yahoo!, Microsoft, and Cisco with Internet censorship in the People's Republic of China. Members of the caucus asserted that the companies had agreed to block "politically sensitive terms" from their search engines. The companies refused to attend the hearings. A year later, Lantos excoriated CEO Jerry Yang for Yahoo's aiding the Chinese government in the arrest of dissident journalist Shi Tao, calling Yang and other executives "[moral] pygmies".

"Nurse Nayirah" incident

Lantos was a strong supporter of the 1991 Persian Gulf War. During the run-up to the war, the Congressional Human Rights Caucus hosted a young Kuwaiti woman identified only as "Nurse Nayirah", who told of horrific abuses by Iraqi soldiers, including the killing of Kuwaiti babies by taking them out of their incubators and leaving them to die on the cold floor of the hospital. Nayirah's testimony was widely publicized. That night, portions of the testimony aired on ABC's Nightline and NBC Nightly News reaching an estimated audience between 35 and 53 million Americans. Seven senators cited Nayirah's testimony in their speeches backing the use of force. President George H.W. Bush repeated the story at least ten times in the following weeks, and Lantos himself argued that Nayirah's account of the atrocities helped to stir American opinion in favor of participation in the Gulf War.

The girl's account was later challenged by independent human rights monitors. "Nurse Nayirah" later turned out to be the daughter of the Kuwaiti ambassador to the United States. Asked about his having allowed the girl to give testimony without identifying herself, and without her story having been corroborated, Lantos replied, "The notion that any of the witnesses brought to the caucus through the Kuwaiti Embassy would not be credible did not cross my mind... I have no basis for assuming that her story is not true, but the point goes beyond that. If one hypothesizes that the woman's story is fictitious from A to Z, that in no way diminishes the avalanche of human rights violations."

Lantos and John R. MacArthur, the foremost critic of the Nayirah issue, each had op-eds in The New York Times, in which each accused the other of distortion. MacArthur suggested that Lantos may have materially benefited from his having accommodated Nayirah. Nayirah was later revealed to have connections to lobbying firm Hill & Knowlton in the employ of Kuwaiti activist group Citizens for a Free Kuwait, a lobbying firm which also rented space to the Human Rights Caucus at a "reduced rate". The New York Times condemned Lantos's "lack of candor and lapse of judgment" in presenting her testimony without giving these facts as context, and called for a hearing by the House Ethics Committee.

Congressional institutionalization
Following Lantos's death from cancer in 2008, House Speaker Nancy Pelosi initiated a bill to reform the caucus as the "Tom Lantos Human Rights Commission"; the bill passed unanimously. Topics on which the commission heard testimony in 2011 included sectarian violence in Iraq, women's rights in Afghanistan, water and sanitation issues, rights of indigenous African peoples, and the Bahraini uprising. The two co-chairs and eight members of the executive committee (four from each party) are appointed by the Speaker and Minority Leader.

Executive Committee Members, 117th Congress

Members, 117th Congress

Historical executive committee membership

116th Congress

Historical leadership

See also
Human rights law
Universal Declaration of Human Rights

References

External links
Official website

Caucuses of the United States Congress
Human rights organizations based in the United States
Organizations established in 1983